In mathematics, smooth functions (also called infinitely differentiable functions) and analytic functions are two very important types of functions. One can easily prove that any analytic function of a real argument is smooth. The converse is not true, as demonstrated with the counterexample below.

One of the most important applications of smooth functions with compact support is the construction of so-called mollifiers, which are important in theories of generalized functions, such as Laurent Schwartz's theory of distributions.

The existence of smooth but non-analytic functions represents one of the main differences between differential geometry and analytic geometry. In terms of sheaf theory, this difference can be stated as follows: the sheaf of differentiable functions on a differentiable manifold is fine, in contrast with the analytic case.

The functions below are generally used to build up partitions of unity on differentiable manifolds.

An example function

Definition of the function

Consider the function

defined for every real number x.

The function is smooth

The function f has continuous derivatives of all orders at every point x of the real line.  The formula for these derivatives is

where pn(x) is a polynomial of degree n − 1 given recursively by p1(x) = 1 and

for any positive integer n.  From this formula, it is not completely clear that the derivatives are continuous at 0; this follows from the one-sided limit 

for any nonnegative integer m.

By the power series representation of the exponential function, we have for every natural number  (including zero)

We now prove the formula for the nth derivative of f by mathematical induction. Using the chain rule, the reciprocal rule, and the fact that the derivative of the exponential function is again the exponential function, we see that the formula is correct for the first derivative of f for all x > 0 and that p1(x) is a polynomial of degree 0. Of course, the derivative of f is zero for x < 0.
It remains to show that the right-hand side derivative of f at x = 0 is zero. Using the above limit, we see that

The induction step from n to n + 1 is similar. For x > 0 we get for the derivative

where pn+1(x) is a polynomial of degree n = (n + 1) − 1. Of course, the (n + 1)st derivative of f is zero for x < 0. For the right-hand side derivative of f (n) at x = 0 we obtain with the above limit

The function is not analytic
As seen earlier, the function f is smooth, and all its derivatives at the origin are 0. Therefore, the Taylor series of f at the origin converges everywhere to the zero function,

and so the Taylor series does not equal f(x) for x > 0. Consequently, f is not analytic at the origin.

Smooth transition functions

The function

has a strictly positive denominator everywhere on the real line, hence g is also smooth. Furthermore, g(x) = 0 for x ≤ 0 and g(x) = 1 for x ≥ 1, hence it provides a smooth transition from the level 0 to the level 1 in the unit interval [0, 1]. To have the smooth transition in the real interval [a, b] with a < b, consider the function

For real numbers , the smooth function

equals 1 on the closed interval [b, c] and vanishes outside the open interval (a, d), hence it can serve as a bump function.

A smooth function which is nowhere real analytic

A more pathological example is an infinitely differentiable function which is not analytic at any point. It can be constructed by means of a  Fourier series as follows. Define for all 

Since the series  converges for all , this function is easily seen to be of class  C∞,  by a standard inductive application of the Weierstrass M-test to demonstrate uniform convergence of each series of derivatives.

As a consequence, at any such 

Application to Taylor series 

For every sequence α0, α1, α2, . . . of real or complex numbers, the following construction shows the existence of a smooth function F on the real line which has these numbers as derivatives at the origin. In particular, every sequence of numbers can appear as the coefficients of the Taylor series of a smooth function.  This result is known as Borel's lemma, after Émile Borel.

With the smooth transition function g as above, define

This function h is also smooth; it equals 1 on the closed interval [−1,1] and vanishes outside the open interval (−2,2). Using h, define for every natural number n (including zero) the smooth function

which agrees with the monomial xn on [−1,1] and vanishes outside the interval (−2,2). Hence, the k-th derivative of ψn at the origin satisfies

and the boundedness theorem implies that ψn and every derivative of ψn is bounded. Therefore, the constants

involving the supremum norm of ψn and its first n derivatives, are well-defined real numbers. Define the scaled functions

By repeated application of the chain rule,

and, using the previous result for the k-th derivative of ψn at zero,

It remains to show that the function

is well defined and can be differentiated term-by-term infinitely many times. To this end, observe that for every k

where the remaining infinite series converges by the ratio test.

Application to higher dimensions 

For every radius r > 0,

with Euclidean norm ||x|| defines a smooth function on n-dimensional Euclidean space with support in the ball of radius r, but .

Complex analysis
This pathology cannot occur with differentiable functions of a complex variable rather than of a real variable. Indeed, all holomorphic functions are analytic, so that the failure of the function f defined in this article to be analytic in spite of its being infinitely differentiable is an indication of one of the most dramatic differences between real-variable and complex-variable analysis.

Note that although the function f has derivatives of all orders over the real line, the analytic continuation of f from the positive half-line x > 0 to the complex plane, that is, the function

has an essential singularity at the origin, and hence is not even continuous, much less analytic. By the great Picard theorem, it attains every complex value (with the exception of zero) infinitely many times in every neighbourhood of the origin.

See also
 Bump function
 Fabius function
 Flat function
 Mollifier

Notes

External links
 

Smooth functions
Articles containing proofs